Power Wheels is a brand of battery-powered ride-on toy cars for kids ages one to seven years old. Power Wheels ride-ons are built with kid-sized, realistic features – in some cases, real working features like FM radios, opening/closing doors and hoods, and both forward and reverse motion.

History 
The product itself was created by an Italian company, Peg Perego, which started up in 1949. Peg-Perego eventually began using gel cell batteries in their wheeled machines, and the product line was launched. The Power Wheels brand name dates back to 1984, when San Francisco-based toy company Kransco acquired Pines of America, makers of battery-powered vehicles for children. Two years later, Kransco renamed the line "Power Wheels". By 1990 sales of the battery-powered vehicles reached over 1,000,000 per year.

In 1994, the Power Wheels Line was bought by Mattel, who placed it under their Fisher-Price subsidiary. With the addition of new vehicle licenses the new Power Wheels lines did well.

In 1999, Fisher-Price announced the Harley-Davidson Motorcycle Ride-On – which contributed to a year of record sales for the entire product line.

Power Wheels vehicles 
Power Wheels ride-on cars, trucks and motorcycles have been sold with more than 100 model names.

The latest line of Power Wheels features small scale versions of popular real world vehicles, including the Jeep Wrangler, Jeep Hurricane, Ford F-150, Ford Mustang, Kawasaki KFX quad, Harley-Davidson motorcycle, Cadillac Escalade EXT as well as Lightning McQueen from the Pixar’s film Cars, and a Thomas the Tank Engine with a circle of track.

Safety recalls 
The first recall in 1991 involved the 18 Volt Porsche 911, in which the contacts in the foot pedal switch could weld together in use.  If this were to happen, the motor would remain running and the vehicle would continue moving forward, unable to stop. A new accelerator pedal was fitted that eliminated the possibility of welded contacts.

In 1998, Fisher-Price undertook a monumental recall of up to 10 million Power Wheels 12 volt and Super 6 volt vehicles manufactured since 1986. The recall and repair program was conducted to replace battery fuses and strengthen battery connectors in order to prevent the units from overheating. The main difference of a post recall Power Wheel is that the original "H" (or on very early Power Wheels, "S") connectors are removed and replaced with the larger, black "A" connectors. If a Power Wheels ride-on was built in or before 1998 and has the Black "A" connectors, then the recall work has probably been performed.

The third recall in 2000 involved the Harley-Davidson motor cycle ride-ons, In cooperation with the U.S. Consumer Product Safety Commission (CPSC), Fisher-Price recalled about 218,000 battery-powered Power Wheels Harley-Davidson motorcycle ride-ons for repair. The foot pedals, which activate the ride-ons, could stick in the "on" position.

The fourth recall in 2019 involved the Barbie Dream Camper model FRC29 with the grey foot pedal, due to fall hazards and a pedal issue that causes the ride-on to keep moving when the pedal was released.

References

External links
 Official Power Wheels Website

Toy cars and trucks
Battery electric vehicles
Fisher-Price
Products introduced in 1984
Toy recalls